Yana Denisovna Dobrovolskaya (born 8 December 1997) is a Russian dancer, model, and beauty pageant titleholder who won Miss Russia 2016. She represented Russia at the Miss World 2016 pageant.

Early life
Dobrovolskaya born in Tyumen.

Pageantry

Miss Russia 2016
Dobrovolskaya competed as Miss Tyumen in Miss Russia 2016 on April 16, 2016. She was later declared the winner, succeeding Miss Russia 2015 Sofia Nikitchuk of Yekaterinburg.

Miss World 2016
Dobrovolskaya represented Russia in the Miss World 2016 pageant where she was unplaced.

References

1997 births
People from Tyumen
Living people
Russian beauty pageant winners
Russian female models
Russian female dancers
Miss Russia winners
Miss World 2016 delegates